Brookfield Craft Center, located in Brookfield, Connecticut, is a  501(c)(3) not-for-profit organization, founded in 1954 with the mission "to teach and preserve the skills of fine craftsmanship and enable creativity and personal growth through craft education."  Subjects taught at the craft center include basketry, beadwork, blacksmithing, bladesmithing, ceramics, glass, jewelry making, metalsmithing, fiber and weaving, woodturning, woodworking, photography, paper and book arts, decorative arts, painting and drawing, and business / marketing for artists.

Its six buildings house seven fully equipped studios, an exhibition gallery, a retail craft gallery and gift shop, and housing for visiting faculty.

References

External links
 Official Website

Art museums and galleries in Connecticut
Arts centers in Connecticut
Art schools in Connecticut
Brookfield, Connecticut
Buildings and structures in Brookfield, Connecticut
Decorative arts
Charities based in Connecticut
Tourist attractions in Fairfield County, Connecticut
Arts organizations established in 1954